Valldaura is a Barcelona Metro station, in the Horta-Guinardó district of Barcelona. The station is served by line L3.

The station is located underneath the Passeig de Valldaura, between Carrer Canigó and Carrer Hedilla in the north-east of the city. The island-platform station has a single access at Carrer Canigó. The station is wheelchair-accessible via elevators.

The station was opened in 2001, when the section of line L3 from Montbau station to Canyelles station was inaugurated. It was designed by Manel Sánchez.

References

External links
 

Barcelona Metro line 3 stations
Railway stations in Spain opened in 2001